Carl Georg Siöblad (2 November 1683 – 1 September 1754) was a Swedish naval officer who served as Governor of Malmöhus County and  Blekinge County

Biography
He was born in Södermanland to Baron Erik Carlsson Sjöblad (1647-1725) and  Charlotta Regina Palbitzki (1663-1738).
He became a second lieutenant at the Admiralty in 1699, and was promoted to vice admiral in 1719. On 27 July 1720, against orders, he attacked a much larger Russian naval force. His force consisted of three ships, three frigates, and three merchant ships. In 1734, he was appointed governor of Blekinge County and in  1740 he became Governor of Malmö where he served till his death at Marsvinsholm Castle in 1754.

Personal life
He was married to Countess Beata Elisabeth Stenbock (1693-1765), daughter of Johanna Eleonora De la Gardie (1661-1708) and Count Erik Gustaf Stenbock.  Their daughter  Ebba Christina Siöbladh (1720- 1786) was the grandmother of nobleman Eric Ruuth (1746–1820),  Lord of Marsvinsholm.

See also
Stenbock

References

Swedish admirals
1683 births
1754 deaths
People from Södermanland
Swedish military personnel of the Great Northern War
Governors of Blekinge County
Governors of Malmöhus County
Age of Liberty people